Ukrainian Ye with diaeresis (Є̈ є̈; italics: Є̈ є̈) is a letter of the Cyrillic script.

Ukrainian Ye with diaeresis is used in the Khanty language.

See also
Cyrillic characters in Unicode

Cyrillic letters with diacritics
Letters with diaeresis